A Stray is a 2016 American drama film starring Barkhad Abdirahman.

Plot
A young Somali man named Adan (played by Barkhad Abdirahman) is kicked out of his home and must survive on the streets of his hometown, Minneapolis. He begrudgingly befriends a stray dog, which brings him companionship. However, it also brings Adan further exile from his family, his friends, and his community, as caring for a dog as a pet may be seen as haram for Muslims, especially in Somali culture. The film explores loneliness and belonging with intimate shots of Minneapolis seen through the eyes of a downtrodden Somali immigrant.

Cast
Barkhad Abdirahman as Adan
Christina Baldwin
Ifrah Mansour
Faysal Ahmed
Fathia Absie
Ismael Abdullahi

Reception
The film has a 100% rating on Rotten Tomatoes.  Omer M. Mozaffar of RogerEbert.com awarded the film four stars.  Chris Hewitt of the St. Paul Pioneer Press awarded it three and a half stars.  Colin Covert of the Star Tribune gave the film three and a half stars out of four.

However, the film received a negative review from Thaddeus McCollum and Cameron Meier of Orlando Weekly; they awarded the film one and a half stars out of five.

References

External links
 
 

2016 films
American drama films
Somali-language films
Films set in Minnesota
Films shot in Minnesota
2010s American films